Fury is the fifth studio album by the Australian rock band Sick Puppies. Released on May 20, 2016 through DrillDown Entertainment Group LLC, it is the band's first album with new vocalist Bryan Scott, who replaced original vocalist Shimon Moore. The lead single "Stick to Your Guns" was released on March 31, 2016. The album cover was revealed on April 15, 2016. Pre-orders for the album began on April 22, 2016.

Track listing

Personnel
Sick Puppies
Bryan Scott – lead vocals, guitars
Emma Anzai – bass, backing vocals, lead vocals on "Walls (You Changed)"
Mark Goodwin – drums

Charts

References

2016 albums
Sick Puppies albums